Vasileios Floros (born 24 January 1985) is a Greek modern pentathlete. He competed in the men's individual event at the 2004 Summer Olympics.

References

1985 births
Living people
Greek male modern pentathletes
Olympic modern pentathletes of Greece
Modern pentathletes at the 2004 Summer Olympics
Sportspeople from Athens
Swimmers from Athens
Athletes from Athens